was a village located in Iwata District, Shizuoka Prefecture, Japan.

As of March 1, 2005, the village had an estimated population of 11,306 and a density of 284 persons per km². The total area was 39.78 km².

On April 1, 2005, Toyooka, along with the towns of Fukude, Ryūyō and Toyoda (all from Iwata District), was merged into the expanded city of Iwata and thus no longer exists as an independent municipality.

External links
 Iwata official website 

Dissolved municipalities of Shizuoka Prefecture
Iwata, Shizuoka